In mathematics and theoretical physics, the Berezinian or superdeterminant is a generalization of the determinant to the case of supermatrices. The name is for Felix Berezin. The Berezinian plays a role analogous to the determinant when considering coordinate changes for integration on a supermanifold.

Definition
The Berezinian is uniquely determined by two defining properties:

where str(X) denotes the supertrace of X. Unlike the classical determinant, the Berezinian is defined only for invertible supermatrices.

The simplest case to consider is the Berezinian of a supermatrix with entries in a field K. Such supermatrices represent linear transformations of a super vector space over K. A particular even supermatrix is a block matrix of the form

Such a matrix is invertible if and only if both A and D are invertible matrices over K. The Berezinian of X is given by

For a motivation of the negative exponent see the substitution formula in the odd case.

More generally, consider matrices with entries in a supercommutative algebra R. An even supermatrix is then of the form

where A and D have even entries and B and C have odd entries. Such a matrix is invertible if and only if both A and D are invertible in the commutative ring R0 (the even subalgebra of R). In this case the Berezinian is given by

or, equivalently, by

These formulas are well-defined since we are only taking determinants of matrices whose entries are in the commutative ring R0.  The matrix

 

is known as the Schur complement of A relative to 

An odd matrix X can only be invertible if the number of even dimensions equals the number of odd dimensions.  In this case, invertibility of X is equivalent to the invertibility of JX, where

Then the Berezinian of X is defined as

Properties

Berezinian module

The determinant of an endomorphism of a  free module M can be defined as the induced action on the 1-dimensional highest exterior power of M. In the supersymmetric case there is no highest exterior power, but there is a still a similar definition of the Berezinian as follows. 

Suppose that M is a free module of dimension (p,q) over R. Let A be the (super)symmetric algebra S*(M*) of the dual M* of M. Then an automorphism of M acts on the ext module

(which has dimension (1,0) if q is even and dimension (0,1) if q is odd))
as multiplication by  the Berezinian.

See also
Berezin integration

References

Super linear algebra
Determinants